You, the Night ... and the Music is the debut album of Gallon Drunk. It was released in 1992 through Clawfist.

Track listing

Personnel 
Gallon Drunk
Joe Byfield – maracas
Max Décharné – drums
Mike Delanian – bass guitar
James Johnston – vocals, guitar, organ
Production and additional personnel
Gallon Drunk – production
Tony Harris – production, engineering

References

External links 
 

1992 debut albums
Gallon Drunk albums